Forges or Les Forges may refer to:

In Belgium
Forges, Belgium, a village and a former municipality that is now a part of Chimay, Wallonia

In France
Forges, Charente-Maritime, in the Charente-Maritime department
Forges, Maine-et-Loire, in the Maine-et-Loire department
Forges, Orne, in the Orne department
Forges, Seine-et-Marne, in the Seine-et-Marne department
Forgès, in the Corrèze department
Les Forges, Deux-Sèvres, in the Deux-Sèvres department
Les Forges, Morbihan, in the Morbihan department
Les Forges, Vosges, in the Vosges department
Forges-la-Forêt, in the Ille-et-Vilaine department
Forges-les-Bains, in the Essonne department
Forges-les-Eaux, in the Seine-Maritime department
Forges-sur-Meuse, in the Meuse department
Auvillers-les-Forges, in the Ardennes department
Bailly-aux-Forges, in the Haute-Marne department
Briis-sous-Forges, in the Essonne department
Châtenois-les-Forges, in the Territoire de Belfort department
Cousances-les-Forges, in the Meuse department
Cussey-les-Forges, in the Côte-d'Or department
Cussy-les-Forges, in the Yonne department
Naix-aux-Forges, in the Meuse department
Perrecy-les-Forges, in the Saône-et-Loire department
Pontenx-les-Forges, in the Landes department
Saint-Aubin-les-Forges, in the Nièvre department
Saint-Bômer-les-Forges, in the Orne department
Saint-Maurice-aux-Forges, in the Meurthe-et-Moselle department
Sept-Forges, in the Orne department
Sexey-aux-Forges, in the Meurthe-et-Moselle department

People
Antonio Fraguas de Pablo (born 1942), known by his artist name Forges, Spanish cartoonist
Françoise Forges (born 1958), Belgian-born French economist

See also
Forge (disambiguation)